Katiannidae is a family of Collembola. Genera of the family include Sminthurinus and Vesicephalus.

References

Collembola
Arthropod families